The men's 50 kilometres walk event  at the Friendship Games was held on 18 August 1984 in Moscow, Soviet Union.

Results

See also
Athletics at the 1984 Summer Olympics – Men's 50 kilometres walk

References
 
 

Athletics at the Friendship Games
Friendship Games